Myosotis laxa is a species of forget-me-not known by several common names, including tufted forget-me-not, bay forget-me-not, small-flower forget-me-not, and small-flowered forget-me-not. It has a circumboreal distribution, occurring throughout some parts of the Northern Hemisphere. It grows in many types of habitat, including moist and wet areas; it is sometimes aquatic, growing in shallow water.

Henry David Thoreau described Myosotis laxa: 
The mouse-ear forget-me-not, Myosotis laxa, has now extended
its racemes (?) very much, and hangs over the edge of the brook. It is one of the most interesting minute
flowers. It is the more beautiful for being small and unpretending; even flowers must be modest.

References

External links
Jepson Manual Treatment
Photo gallery

laxa
Flora of Asia
Flora of Europe
Flora of North America